The blue-mouthed skink (Caesoris novaecaledoniae)  is a skink in the (family Scincidae).  It is monotypic in the genus Caesoris. It is endemic to New Caledonia.

References

Skinks of New Caledonia
Reptiles described in 1926
Taxa named by Hampton Wildman Parker